James Howard Miller (February 1, 1920 – October 16, 2006) was an American football player and coach.  A native of Massilon, Ohio, he served as at the head football coach at Niagara University from 1949 to 1950, at the University of Detroit from 1959 to 1961, and at Boston College from 1962 to 1967.  Before going to Detroit, he worked for five years as an assistant coach at Purdue University, where he had played as a guard.  After an 8–2 season at Boston College in 1962, Miller signed a new three-year contract with a substantial pay hike. On December 7, 1967, after a 4–6 record, he resigned as Eagles head coach.

Early life and playing career
Miller played high school football at Massillon Washington High School under Paul Brown.

Head coaching record

References

1920 births
2006 deaths
American football guards
Boston College Eagles football coaches
Buffalo Bulls football coaches
Detroit Titans football coaches
Niagara Purple Eagles football coaches
Purdue Boilermakers football coaches
Purdue Boilermakers football players
Sportspeople from Massillon, Ohio
Coaches of American football from Ohio
Players of American football from Ohio